Cordyceps militaris is a species of fungus in the family Cordycipitaceae, and the type species of the genus Cordyceps. It was originally described by Carl Linnaeus in 1753 as Clavaria militaris.

Description

Macroscopic characteristics

The fungus forms 1–8 cm high, club-shaped and orange/red fruiting bodies, which grow out of dead underground pupae. The club is covered with the stroma, into which the actual fruit bodies, the perithecia, are inserted. The surface appears roughly punctured. The inner fungal tissue is whitish to pale orange.

Microscopic features

The spores are smooth, hyaline, long-filiform, and often septate. They decompose to maturity in 3–7 μm × 1–1.2 μm subpores. The asci are long and cylindrical. Sometimes an anamorphic state, which is Isaria, is found. Masses of white mycelia form around the parasitised insect; however, these may not be of the same species.

Ecology and dispersal
Cordyceps militaris is a entomopathogenic fungus, meaning it parasitizes insects. Many authors consider it quite common, spread throughout the northern hemisphere, and fruiting bodies appear in Europe from August to November.

Cultivation and use

C. militaris can be cultivated in a variety of media, including silkworm pupae, rice, and liquid nutrition. It is considered inedible or "probably edible" by North American field guides. In Asia the fruiting body is cooked as a mushroom in dishes like chicken soup, pork bone soup and hot pot.

C. militaris is a potential harbourer of bio-metabolites for herbal drugs and there is evidence from ancient times for its applications for revitalization of various systems of the body. In traditional Chinese medicine, this fungus can serve as a cheap substitute for Ophiocordyceps sinensis. Both contain cordycepin.

C. militaris contains a protein CMP18 which induces apoptosis in vitro via a mitochondrion-dependent pathway. It is thought that it might be toxic when eaten. Cooking destroys this protein.

Distribution area 
In June 2019, researchers discovered Cordyceps militaris at an altitude of 2500m in Hoàng Liên National Park Sa Pa- Lao Cai, Vietnam.

Similar species 
Cordyceps in the wild has more than 400 different species. Similar species include Cordyceps sobolifera, Elaphocordyceps capitata, and Elaphocordyceps ophioglossoides.

Chemistry 
Bai & Sheu 2018 find a new protein causing apoptosis. Song et al., 2009 finds microwave-assisted extraction to be a good technique for polysaccharide extraction from this fungus.

Like other members of the Cordyceps genus, Cordyceps Militaris produces the pharmacologically active compound cordycepin. Cordycepin is a nucleoside analogue of adenosine-differing by only a single hydroxyl group. It has been shown to induce apoptosis, reduce inflammation, and inhibit RNA transcription in cells. For these reasons, it is under study for its anti-metastatic properties.

References

External links

 

militaris
Fungi described in 1753
Taxa named by Carl Linnaeus